Ariya Jutanugarn (born 23 November 1995) is a Thai professional golfer who plays on the American-based LPGA Tour. She was born in Bangkok. She is the first golfer, male or female, from Thailand to win a major championship. She became the number one ranked golfer in the Women's World Golf Rankings in June 2017.

Family
Jutanugarn has an older sister, Moriya, who is also a professional golfer. Their parents are father Somboon and mother Narumon and they have four older half-siblings through their father. The two sisters often play matches together and travel with their parents, who handle their business and financial affairs. The parents own a professional golf shop at the Rose Garden Golf Course near Bangkok.

Career
Jutanugarn qualified for the 2007 Honda LPGA Thailand at age 11, making her the youngest player ever to qualify for an LPGA Tour event. As of early May 2013, she had played in three LPGA tournaments and four Ladies European Tour (LET) tournaments and had five top-4 finishes. In 2012, she was winner of the American Junior Golf Association (AFGA) girl Player of the Year for the second consecutive year. She turned professional at the end of 2012 and joined the Ladies European Tour in 2013.

Jutanugarn has an aggressive and fearless playing style. At the 2013 Honda LPGA Thailand, she led by two shots going to the final hole and lost by one shot to Korea's Inbee Park. She placed 4th one week later at the HSBC Women's Champions in Singapore. A few weeks later, she won her first professional tournament at the LET's Lalla Meryem Cup in Morocco. The win put her on top of the LET Order of Merit (money list). She led the first two days at the Kingsmill Championship in Williamsburg, Virginia in May 2013. She shot a 7-under-par on the first day.

In a practice round at the 2013 Wegmans LPGA Championship, Jutanugarn injured her shoulder by tumbling down an incline while chasing her sister Moriya with a water bottle. The injury required corrective surgery, which was performed in Bangkok.

Jutanugarn finished T-3 at the LPGA Final Qualifying Tournament to earn her tour card for 2015. At the 2016 ANA Inspiration, she had a two-stroke lead with three holes left and closed with three bogeys to finish fourth.

At the 2016 Yokohama Tire LPGA Classic, Jutanugarn earned her first LPGA Tour win and became the first Thai winner on this tour. She went on to win the next two LPGA tournaments, thereby becoming the first player in LPGA history to win her first three titles in consecutive fashion. Jutanugarn won her first major championship with a three-stroke victory at the 2016 Women's British Open.

Despite a mid-season slump in 2017 where Jutanugarn missed five cuts plus one withdrawal in a seven-tournament stretch, she still managed to win her 6th and 7th Tour titles. Her second Tour title of the year was the CME Group Tour Championship, the last event of the year, where she won $500,000 after finishing the weekend with back-to-back 67s. In addition to her two Tour wins, Jutanugarn racked up three runner-up finishes, a third place showing, and a total of 10 top-10 appearances which saw her win $1,549,858 and bringing her career total to $4,583,332. This was the second consecutive season where she earned more than $1,500,000.

In 2018, Jutanugarn won three times, including the U.S. Women's Open on 3 June 2018. On 18 November 2018, Jutanugarn won the season-long Race to the CME Globe and the $1,000,000 bonus. For the 2018 season, Jutanugarn won the LPGA Player of the Year, the LPGA Vare Trophy with a scoring average of 69.415, the Leaders Top 10 competition with 17 top-10 finishes and the LPGA money title at $2,743,949. She also set single-season records in rounds in the 60s (57) and birdies (470). She ended the 2018 season ranked number one in the world.

In May 2021, Jutanugarn won the Honda LPGA Thailand in her home country. It was her first victory since 2018. After the win, she told media that she had considered quitting golf during her winless seasons in 2019 and 2020.

Amateur wins (10)
2011 U.S. Girls' Junior, AJGA Rolex Girls Junior, Junior PGA, Junior orange bowl international
2012 Canadian Women's Amateur, AJGA Rolex Girls Junior, Junior PGA, AJGA Polo Golf Junior Classic, Women's Western Amateur, Thunderbird international Junior

Professional wins (13)

LPGA Tour wins (12)

Co-sanctioned by the Ladies European Tour.

LPGA Tour playoff record (3–2)

Ladies European Tour wins (3)

Major championships

Wins (2)

1 Defeated Kim in a two-hole aggregate playoff followed by a sudden-death playoff: Jutanugarn (4-4-4-4=16) and Kim (3-5-4-5=17)

Results timeline
Results not in chronological order before 2019.

^ The Evian Championship was added as a major in 2013.

LA = low amateur
CUT = missed the half-way cut
NT = no tournament
"T" = tied

Summary

Most consecutive cuts made – 20 (2018 ANA – 2022 Chevron)
Longest streak of top-10s – 3 (2016 British Open – 2017 ANA)

LPGA Tour career summary

* as of the 2022 season

World ranking
Position in Women's World Golf Rankings at the end of each calendar year.

Team appearances
Amateur
Asian Games (representing Thailand): 2010

Professional
International Crown (representing Thailand): 2014, 2016, 2018
Amata Friendship Cup (representing Thailand): 2018 (winners)

Royal decorations 
 2016 –  Companion (Fourth Class) of The Most Admirable Order of the Direkgunabhorn
 2017 –  Commander (Third Class) of The Most Admirable Order of the Direkgunabhorn

See also
List of golfers with most LPGA major championship wins
List of golfers with most LPGA Tour wins

References

External links

Career Stats

Ariya Jutanugarn
Ladies European Tour golfers
LPGA Tour golfers
Winners of LPGA major golf championships
Ariya Jutanugarn
Golfers at the 2016 Summer Olympics
Golfers at the 2020 Summer Olympics
Golfers at the 2010 Asian Games
Ariya Jutanugarn
Ariya Jutanugarn
Ariya Jutanugarn
1995 births
Living people
Ariya Jutanugarn